K-9 to 5 is an American television program about dogs with jobs. It is shown on the channel Animal Planet.

Each episode features three or more dogs with "everyday jobs", doing everything from traditional service dog work to ranch hand/shepherding work to more uncommon things like polar bear sentry duty in Northern Canada or bowling pin collector at a Florida bowling alley.  The final segment is called "Howlin' Good Time" and features recreation activities for dogs such as surfing, freestyle dancing, and "Yappy Hour" at a local pub.

See also
Dogs with Jobs, a Canadian documentary television program featuring working dogs

External links
https://www.imdb.com/title/tt2138457/

K-9 to 5
Television shows about dogs